Amy M. Wetherby, Ph.D., CCC-SLP, is a distinguished research professor in the Department of Clinical Sciences, director of the Autism Institute in the College of Medicine, and the Laurel Schendel Professor of Communication Disorders at Florida State University. She has thirty years of clinical experience, and is a fellow of the American Speech-Language-Hearing Association.

She graduated from the State University of New York at Buffalo in 1977 with a B.A. in Communication Disorders and Sciences, and received a Ph.D. in Speech and Hearing Sciences from University of California, Santa Barbara in 1982. 

Wetherby has published extensively, and presents regularly at national conventions on early detection of children with autism spectrum disorders and intervention for children with such disorders using the SCERTS model. She is the project director of a Doctoral Leadership Training Grant specializing in autism, funded by the U.S. Department of Education. Wetherby served on the National Academy of Sciences Committee for Educational Interventions for Children with Autism, and is the executive director of the Florida State University Center for Autism and Related Disabilities. Wetherby is also the project director of the FIRST WORDS Project, a longitudinal research investigation on early detection of autism spectrum and other communication disorders, funded by the U.S. Department of Education, National Institutes of Health, and Centers for Disease Control and Prevention.

Wetherby is also the principal investigator of the Early Social Interaction Project, an early treatment study teaching parents of toddlers with autism spectrum disorders how to support social communication and play in everyday activities funded by Autism Speaks and the National Institutes of Mental Health.

References

External links
 https://www.wsj.com/articles/SB10001424052748703367004576289360947431574 
 http://www.cbsnews.com/stories/2007/10/15/earlyshow/health/main3366548.shtml?source=search_story
 https://web.archive.org/web/20110504124044/http://autismscreening.org/screening_tools/CSBS-DP.htm
 http://med.fsu.edu/?page=autisminstitute.home
 http://autism.fsu.edu/

Living people
Florida State University faculty
Year of birth missing (living people)
University of California, Santa Barbara alumni
University at Buffalo alumni
Fellows of the American Speech–Language–Hearing Association